Leroy Jones (February 10, 1950 – July 11, 2010) was a heavyweight boxer who won the NABF heavyweight championship. He challenged Larry Holmes for the WBC heavyweight title in 1980.

Boxing career
Jones' professional career began with a third-round knockout of John Scroggins on July 30, 1973.  He put together 24 wins with 12 knockouts, including a 12-round points win over future world heavyweight champion Mike Weaver. The Weaver fight won Jones the NABF heavyweight championship, essentially the American title.

During his professional career it became apparent that Jones had a problem with conditioning, as he fought at weights ranging from 228 pounds in 1973 to 271 pounds in 1977.

On March 31, 1980, Jones got his weight down to 254.5 pounds to challenge Larry Holmes for the WBC heavyweight title. Jones was stopped in 8 rounds, on an eye injury that effectively ended his career.

Leroy Jones died in Los Angeles on July 11, 2010.

Professional boxing record

|-
|align="center" colspan=8|25 Wins (13 knockouts, 12 decisions), 1 Loss (1 knockout), 1 Draw 
|-
| align="center" style="border-style: none none solid solid; background: #e3e3e3"|Result
| align="center" style="border-style: none none solid solid; background: #e3e3e3"|Record
| align="center" style="border-style: none none solid solid; background: #e3e3e3"|Opponent
| align="center" style="border-style: none none solid solid; background: #e3e3e3"|Type
| align="center" style="border-style: none none solid solid; background: #e3e3e3"|Round
| align="center" style="border-style: none none solid solid; background: #e3e3e3"|Date
| align="center" style="border-style: none none solid solid; background: #e3e3e3"|Location
| align="center" style="border-style: none none solid solid; background: #e3e3e3"|Notes
|-align=center
|Win
|25–1–1
|align=left| Jeff Shelburg
|TKO
|2
|26/08/1982
|align=left| Genesis Center, Gary, Indiana
|
|-
|Loss
|24–1–1
|align=left| Larry Holmes
|TKO
|8
|31/03/1980
|align=left| Caesars Palace, Las Vegas, Nevada
|align=left|
|-
|Win
|24–0–1
|align=left| James J Beattie
|KO
|4
|14/07/1979
|align=left| Mile High Stadium, Denver, Colorado
|align=left|
|-
|Win
|23–0–1
|align=left| Harry Terrell
|PTS
|10
|12/05/1979
|align=left| Las Vegas, Nevada
|align=left|
|-
|Win
|22–0–1
|align=left| Fili Moala
|UD
|10
|26/01/1979
|align=left| Coliseum, San Diego, California
|align=left|
|-
|Win
|21–0–1
|align=left| Mike Weaver (boxer)
|UD
|12
|19/08/1978
|align=left| Las Vegas, Nevada
|align=left|
|-
|Win
|20–0–1
|align=left| Gregory Johnson
|UD
|10
|14/09/1977
|align=left| Caesars Palace, Las Vegas, Nevada
|
|-
|Win
|19–0–1
|align=left| John Dino Denis
|PTS
|8
|27/03/1977
|align=left| Randolph AFB, San Antonio, Texas
|align=left|
|-
|Win
|18–0–1
|align=left| Roy Wallace
|TKO
|9
|22/01/1977
|align=left| Civic Auditorium, Pensacola, Florida
|align=left|
|-
|Draw
|17–0–1
|align=left| Pedro Lovell
|PTS
|10
|10/07/1976
|align=left| San Diego Sports Arena, San Diego, California
|
|-
|Win
|17–0
|align=left| Alfredo Mongol Ortiz
|TKO
|6
|13/05/1976
|align=left| Albuquerque Civic Auditorium, Albuquerque, New Mexico
|align=left|
|-
|Win
|16–0
|align=left| Jody Ballard
|KO
|4
|03/03/1976
|align=left| Silver Slipper, Las Vegas, Nevada
|
|-
|Win
|15–0
|align=left| Art Robinson
|KO
|2
|13/09/1975
|align=left| Denver, Colorado
|align=left|
|-
|Win
|14–0
|align=left| Larry Frazier
|PTS
|10
|09/07/1975
|align=left| Las Vegas, Nevada
|align=left|
|-
|Win
|13–0
|align=left| George Johnson
|PTS
|10
|18/03/1975
|align=left| Honolulu, Hawaii
|align=left|
|-
|Win
|12–0
|align=left| Jimmy Gilmore
|PTS
|8
|11/02/1975
|align=left| Hawaii International Center, Honolulu, Hawaii
|align=left|
|-
|Win
|11–0
|align=left| Rico Brooks
|PTS
|10
|29/01/1975
|align=left| Las Vegas, Nevada
|align=left|
|-
|Win
|10–0
|align=left| Eusebio Hernandez, Jr.
|TKO
|6
|18/10/1974
|align=left| Caesars Tahoe, Stateline, Nevada
|align=left|
|-
|Win
|9–0
|align=left| Koli Vailea
|KO
|4
|24/09/1974
|align=left| Silver Slipper, Las Vegas, Nevada
|align=left|
|-
|Win
|8–0
|align=left| Henry Culpepper
|UD
|8
|26/08/1974
|align=left| Silver Slipper, Las Vegas, Nevada
|align=left|
|-
|Win
|7–0
|align=left| Jimmy Gilmore
|PTS
|8
|02/07/1974
|align=left| Las Vegas, Nevada
|align=left|
|-
|Win
|6–0
|align=left| Bob Crutison
|KO
|2
|05/06/1974
|align=left| Las Vegas, Nevada
|align=left|
|-
|Win
|5–0
|align=left| Lou Rogan
|KO
|3
|19/03/1974
|align=left| Denver, Colorado
|align=left|
|-
|Win
|4–0
|align=left| Paul Solomon
|KO
|1
|13/02/1974
|align=left| Silver Slipper, Las Vegas, Nevada
|
|-
|Win
|3–0
|align=left| Bobby Joe Anderson
|KO
|1
|23/01/1974
|align=left| Silver Slipper, Las Vegas, Nevada
|align=left|
|-
|Win
|2–0
|align=left| Larry Frazier
|PTS
|6
|10/01/1974
|align=left| Caesars Tahoe, Stateline, Nevada
|align=left|
|-
|Win
|1–0
|align=left| John Scroggins
|TKO
|3
|30/07/1973
|align=left| Cheyenne, Wyoming
|align=left|
|}

References

External links
 

Boxers from Mississippi
1950 births
Heavyweight boxers
2010 deaths
American male boxers